Senegal competed at the 2004 Summer Olympics in Athens, Greece, from 13 to 29 August 2004. This was the nation's eleventh appearance at the Olympics.

The Senegalese National Olympic and Sports Committee sent a total of sixteen athletes to the Games, six men and ten women, to take part in six different sports. For the second consecutive time in the nation's Olympic history, Senegal was represented by more female than male athletes. Five Senegalese athletes had previously competed in Sydney, including breaststroke swimmer Malick Fall, and hurdler Mame Tacko Diouf, who reprised her role to carry the nation's flag for the second consecutive time. There was only a single competitor in judo, table tennis, and wrestling.

Senegal, however, failed to win its first Olympic medal since the 1988 Summer Olympics in Seoul, where Amadou Dia Bâ won silver for the track hurdles.

Athletics

Senegalese athletes have so far achieved qualifying standards in the following athletics events (up to a maximum of 3 athletes in each event at the 'A' Standard, and 1 at the 'B' Standard).

Key
 Note–Ranks given for track events are within the athlete's heat only
 Q = Qualified for the next round
 q = Qualified for the next round as a fastest loser or, in field events, by position without achieving the qualifying target
 NR = National record
 N/A = Round not applicable for the event
 Bye = Athlete not required to compete in round

Men
Track & road events

Field events

Women
Track & road events

Field events

Fencing

Two Senegalese fencers were selected to compete for the following events through a tripartite invitation.

Women

Judo

Senegal has qualified a single judoka.

Swimming

Senegalese swimmers earned qualifying standards in the following events (up to a maximum of 2 swimmers in each event at the A-standard time, and 1 at the B-standard time):

Men

Women

Table tennis

Senegal has selected a single tennis player through a tripartite invitation.

Wrestling

Key
  – Victory by Fall.
  – Decision by Points – the loser with technical points.
  – Decision by Points – the loser without technical points.

Men's freestyle

See also
 Senegal at the 2004 Summer Paralympics

References

External links
Official Report of the XXVIII Olympiad

Nations at the 2004 Summer Olympics
2004 Summer Olympics
Olympics